José M. Cabanillas (September 23, 1901 – September 15, 1979), was a rear admiral in the United States Navy who as an executive officer of the USS Texas participated in the invasions of North Africa and the Battle of Normandy (also known as D-Day) during World War II.

Early years
Cabanillas was born to José C. Cabanillas and Asunción Grau de Cabanillas in the city of Mayagüez, which is located in the western coast of Puerto Rico.  There he received his primary and secondary education. In 1917, at the age of 16, he was sent to Alabama to attend the Marion Military Institute. In the  school he underwent a two-year preparatory course which prepared him for the United States Naval Academy.

Naval career
He graduated from the institute in 1919 and on June 16, 1920, received an appointment from Arthur Yager, the U.S.-appointed governor of Puerto Rico from 1913 to 1921, to attend the United States Naval Academy. Cabanillas graduated from the Academy on June 4, 1924, and was commissioned an ensign in the U.S. Navy. Prior to World War II, Cabanillas served aboard various cruisers, destroyers and submarines. Among the battleships that he served in were the USS Florida, USS Colorado and USS Oklahoma. 
From June 1927 to January 1928 he received instruction in submarines at the Submarine Base, New London, Connecticut, after which he served in the USS S-3 until May 1930. Cabanillas earned a Master of Science in June 1932 from Yale University.

World War II

In 1942, upon the outbreak of World War II, he was assigned executive officer of the USS Texas (BB-35). The USS Texas was the oldest remaining dreadnought, and was one of only two remaining ships to have served in both world wars at that time.  On November 8, the Texas participated in the invasion of North Africa. by destroying an ammunition dump near Port Lyautey. Cabanillas also participated in the invasion of Normandy on (D-day). On June 6, 1944, his ship's secondary battery went to work on another target, Cherbourg, France, on the western end of "Omaha" beach. Cabanillas was awarded the Bronze Star Medal with Combat "V," for "meritorious achievement and outstanding performance of duty as executive officer of the USS Texas during the Invasion of Normandy and the bombardment of Cherbourg. His Bronze medal citation reads as follows:

In 1945, Cabanillas became the first commanding officer of the USS Grundy, which was commissioned on January 3, 1945.  The Grundy helped in the evacuation of Americans from China during the Chinese Civil War. Under his command, the Grundy earned the following citations: China Service Medal (extended), American Campaign Medal, Asiatic-Pacific Campaign Medal, World War II Victory Medal and the Navy Occupation Service Medal (with Asia clasp). In December 1945, he was reassigned to Naval Station Norfolk located in Norfolk, Virginia, as Assistant Chief of Staff (Discipline), 5th Naval District.

Korean War
In July 1949, Cabanillas was transferred to Naval Station Orange, located in Orange, Texas, where he served as commanding officer.

In July 1950, he became commander of the USS Dixie, a destroyer tender in the Pacific. During the Korean War he provided firing cover to the U.S. Marines involved in the Inchon invasion. In 1951, Cabanillas was reassigned to the staff of the United States Pacific Fleet in Hawaii. In 1953, he was transferred to the fifth Naval District in San Juan, Puerto Rico as chief of staff.

Later years

Cabanillas retired from the Navy in 1955 and moved to Richmond, Virginia. In 1956, Cabanillas made use of the benefits of the G.I. Bill and studied law at the University of Richmond School of Law. He passed the Virginia Bar at the end of his second year. He served as law librarian at the University for 6 years and then joined a Richmond law firm.

Cabanillas died on September 15, 1979, at the Hunter Holmes McGuire Veterans Administration Medical Center in Richmond.  He was the first Puerto Rican to make rear admiral in the US Navy, albeit a tombstone promotion.  He was cremated and buried at sea with full military honors.

Awards and recognitions
Among Rear Admiral José M. Cabanillas' decorations and medals were the following:

See also

Hispanic Admirals in the United States Navy
List of Puerto Ricans
Puerto Ricans in World War II
List of Puerto Rican military personnel
Hispanics in the United States Naval Academy
Hispanics in the United States Navy

References

Further reading
Puertorriquenos Who Served With Guts, Glory, and Honor. Fighting to Defend a Nation Not Completely Their Own; by : Greg Boudonck;

External links
Puerto Rico L-Archives 
Marion Military Institute
USS Dixie
USS Grundy

1901 births
1979 deaths
Burials at sea
People from Mayagüez, Puerto Rico
United States Navy personnel of World War II
Marion Military Institute alumni
Puerto Rican United States Navy personnel
United States Naval Academy alumni
United States Navy rear admirals (lower half)
Puerto Rican military officers
University of Richmond School of Law alumni
Yale University alumni